Tohir Malik (27 December 1946 – 16 May 2019) was an Uzbek novelist and story writer. He was awarded Uzbek National Writer in 2000. Multiple films were made based on his novels and fictions, such as Last bullet (Uzbek language|Uzbek: So’nggi o’q) in 1994.

Early life

Tohir Malik was born on December 27, 1946, in Tashkent, in a family of military workers. Malik faced difficulties in his childhood in the aftermath of World War II. These difficulties kept Malik from attending secondary school. He instead learned from his older brothers and sisters. Uzbek writer and interpreter Mirzakalon Ismoiliy was his uncle, who was killed by the government in 1949.

Tohir's first story was written and published in 1960, Gulxan magazine. In 1963 he entered Tashkent State University and studied journalism. Malik practiced writing short tales, and started writing in fantasy genre, which was new to Uzbekistan. As a student he wrote "Hikmat afandining o'limi", the first ever fantasy fiction story in the history of Uzbekistan. His novels and stories were translated into Russian and other languages. So'nggi o'q led to a 7 part film, while Shaytanata generated a 20 episode series.

After graduation Tohir taught in many schools, and became the department director of "Lenin uchquni". He then worked in Republican tele-radio union, for publisher Gulistan and for the Uzbek writers union.

Contributions 

Tohir's work became famous in Uzbekistan. His novel Shaytanat is read in former Soviet Union countries. He helped develop the detective genre in Uzbekistan, penning Falak, Somon yo’li elchilari, Tiriklik suvi, Zaharli g’ubor (rereleased as “Vasvasa”), Chorrahada qolgan odamlar (rereleased as Devona), Charxpalak, Qaldirg’och (rereleased as Savohil), Bir ko’cha bir kecha, So’nggi o’q, Shaytanat, Ov, Murdalar gapirmaydi, Iblis devori, Talvasa, Mehmon tuyg'ular, Jinoyatning uzun yo'li, Odamiylik mulki, Eng kichik jinoyat and Tilla kalamush

Honors 
Tohir was awarded "Uzbekistan's national writer" in 2000 by the edict of President Islam Karimov.

See also 
G'afur G'ulom
Abdulla Qahhor
Abdulla Oripov
Cho'lpon

References

External links 
Article about Tohir Malik kitob.uz
Wikipedia article about Tohir Malik in Uzbek
Article about Tohir Malik kitobim.com
Tohir Malik's visit to INHA University in Tashkent
Tohir Malik's visit to INHA University in Tashkent

Uzbekistani male writers
Writers from Tashkent
Uzbekistani novelists
1946 births
2019 deaths
National University of Uzbekistan alumni
20th-century Uzbekistani writers
21st-century Uzbekistani writers
20th-century novelists
21st-century novelists
20th-century male writers
21st-century male writers